Alexander Romanovsky (born 8 June 1987) is a Russian ice hockey player. He is currently playing with HC Spartak Moscow of the Kontinental Hockey League (|KHL).

Romanovsky made his Kontinental Hockey League (KHL) debut playing with Khimik Voskresensk during the 2008–09 KHL season.

References

External links

1987 births
Living people
HC Spartak Moscow players
Russian ice hockey right wingers
Ice hockey people from Moscow